The Gebhardt C88 is a sports prototype race car, designed, developed and built by German constructor Gebhardt Motorsport, for the Group C2 category of the European Interserie and German ADAC Supercup championships, in 1988. It was briefly converted to an IMSA GTP car, and was entered into the 1990 24 Hours of Daytona, but did not start. It was powered by a  turbocharged Audi straight-five engine, the same type used in the successful Audi Sport Quattro Group B rally car.

References

Group C cars
Sports prototypes
Mid-engined cars
1980s cars